Nicole Miller is a fictional character on the New Zealand soap opera Shortland Street who has been portrayed by Sally Martin since September 2009.

Creation and casting
Nicole was created as a love interest for established character Maia Jeffries (Anna Jullienne). Sally Martin had previously auditioned for 4 other roles before being offered the role of Nicole and was described as calling the portrayal of the same-sex relationship, "liberating". She was happy to be cast and enjoyed the relationship as, "It's something I haven't experienced in real life so it's fun to get stuck into it." However, in accepting the role, Martin had to cut her trademark long hair, something that she and her family were uncomfortable with. In 2011 producers permitted Martin to regrow her hair much to her excitement.

Storylines
Nicole arrived at Shortland Street from Tauranga after winning a job in September 2009. Many suspected Nicole of being a sadistic stalker who was in love with Morgan Braithwaite (Bonnie Soper), however when Morgan confronted Nicole with the allegation, she was shocked to learn the two were, in fact, half sisters. After a long period of flirting, Nicole began to date her boss Maia Jeffries (Anna Jullienne) but they broke up following the revelation Maia was a murderer. Nicole was devastated when Morgan was struck by a car and killed and quickly leapt into a relationship with Maia. However, the pressure caught Nicole and she fled Ferndale. Maia retrieved her several months later and the two resumed their relationship. In 2011 Nicole was disgusted to learn Maia had cheated on her with Jennifer (Sara Wiseman) and rebounded with Maxwell Avia (Robbie Magasiva). However Maxwell slept with Bethany Hall (Michelle Langstone) and Nicole struggled to forgive him. The two stayed together for several more months but things ended permanently in early 2012. Nicole fell in love with her friend Lana Jacobs (Brooke Williams) but before the two could consummate their relationship, Maia returned and Nicole got seriously injured in a helicopter crash. She survived however but ended things with Lana and Maia. Nicole became Director of Nursing and briefly dated Boyd Rolleston (Sam Bunkall) before falling in love with her best friend Vinnie (Pua Magasiva). However Vinnie left her and Nicole briefly rebounded with Bonnie Deane (Steph Cusick) before committing herself to a life of being single. This was short-lived however when she and Vinnie readmitted their love but she instead began to date Harper Whitley (Ria Vandervis). However, her attraction to Vinnie proved too strong and the two rekindled and she fell pregnant. However shortly after the birth of their son Pele, in December 2014 Nicole suffered a brain bleed and after waking from a coma, suffered major problems with her mental fatigue. After concern she may be showing signs of schizophrenia, Nicole realised her love for her family and got engaged to Vinnie. They were then married on September 2 of 2015. Nicole recovered from her brain injury and in March was back at work trying to hold the Nursing Department together due to severe staff shortages at the end of the financial year. In September, 2016 Nicole and Vinnie became joint owners of the IV Bar. Drew's younger brother Cam McCaskil, the Head Chef of the IV was caught buying drugs on the property much to the horror of Nicole and Vinnie. In late 2016 Nicole had an affair with new nurse Ruby Flores she felt guilty and soon enough confessed to Vinnie, after she then supports her mum after her new husband passes away after falling off boat on their honeymoon. The affair led to major strain on Nicole and Vinnies relationship, taking them a while to recover from what happened and Vinnie to properly be able to forgive Nicole.

In May 2017, Nicole was stood down from her job because she had broken protocol under urgency to let Jack Hannah to help with a medical procedure well beyond their knowledge after the volcanic eruptions. She also fell out with Leanne because she never approved of Damo Johnson and Leanne re-entering relationship for the third time. On top of the money issues, on August 1, 2017, Pele was diagnosed with Type I Diabetes, and Michael, as the neglected child caught with the parent's fighting and tending to Pele, was led astray by Felix, Deb's son. Michael later left for Singapore with his birth mother. In October 2017, Vinnie kissed Teuila, a woman he reconnected with whom he had once met many years ago. Nicole was upset when she found out but once again they were able to come back from this and she forgave him.

In 2018, Vinnie's latest investment plans failed again, and after they tried sharing the house and rent rooms out to room rovers. This did not work out as the first room rover lied to them and robbed the house, and the second room rover (Zoe Carlson, who was later revealed as Kate Nathan's sister) did not treat them well. Due to their increasing financial issues, Nicole and Vinnie decided to sell the house to Harper Whitley and Drew McCaskill, where they had to pay for repairs of plumbing after Leanne withheld the information from them that there was a problem with the pipes. On May 1, 2018, Nicole stormed out of the hospital after an argument with Leanne, she was then hit by Finn Warner's car as Finn and Esther were setting off to Detroit to further their careers. Finn was not looking at the road and was in fact drink driving, leading him to not see Nicole walking and hitting her. Nicole was rushed into surgery alive, but with a broken femur and suspected internal bleeding. Two weeks post surgery, she developed deep vein thrombosis in her left leg. Finn was later punished. Nicole also then struggled with anxiety and panic attacks following the accident. In June, she found out via Leanne that Kate, her best friend since high school, and her sister Zoe, are her sisters. Due to an accident involving Jemima over in Singapore, Vinnie was rushed over there, leaving Nicole back in Ferndale. She then had a shock to find out that the attacker/stalker in Ferndale had been watching her as she left work one night, luckily Frank Warner had walked her to her car. On July 2, Vinnie then revealed to Nicole he was given a job offer in Singapore in one of the hotels that Jemima manages, and asked her to move over to Singapore with Pele. Her leg injury improved faster than expected after a week off screen while serving her notice. Her supposed final episode was on 19 July 2018 when she finished her final shifts, and was sent off by her friends and family at the IV Bar. After realising she could not move to Singapore, she broke the news to Vinnie over skype who then ended the marriage. Nicole had since been stalked and harassed by a colleague, Tim, who followed her home and forced his way in to her house. After suffering another panic attack from this, her friends Lincoln and Jack took her out for the night, where her and Lincoln later that night slept together when they were over at Jacks. When Nicole told Leanne that she had a one-night stand with a gay guy, Leanne later saw Nicole and Jack hugging in the IV and assumed it was Jack who she had slept with. Nicole got pregnant to Lincoln Kimiora, but decided to give him and his boyfriend custody of the child. However, their daughter, Kiri died not long after being born.

A few weeks later, Nicole got in touch with her mother's son Eddie who she had to give up when he was born. Eddie moved to Ferndale to reconnect with Leanne and Nicole. On July 2, 2019, Nicole kissed her colleague Zara Mandal (Nivi Summer) after having a night with their friends, which also led them to having sex. Zara was unsure of their relationship until she kissed Nicole in the cafe, where later that day Leanne expressed her support for Nicoles relationship. A few weeks later they broke up due to Zara ending it. In December, she meets new Doctor Marty Walker, and she develops a crush on him, not realising his wife Lisa is dead, and in February 2020, she saves him from a blind date he did not like by kissing him. It turns out they both like each other, but Marty said that he was not ready for another relationship. Because the hospital apartments were sold, she had to live with Drew and Harper, which did not work out after Pele bit Billy, so she moved into a flat with Leanne

In March 2020, a new nurse arrives name Maeve Mullens, and the two take a liking for each other. They have since been going out, and in April, there was a bingo night and Nicole, Marty and Maeve were in one team. Bridget (Lisa's sister who had a crush on Marty) grew jealous over Nicole, thinking she still liked Marty. Marty tried to make Bridget jealous by kissing Nicole, and Bridget calls her a slut, and Maeve reveals to Bridget and Marty that they are a couple. Nicole's housing problem was solved when she moved in with Maeve. She then proposed to Maeve and this led to them having the first on-screen gay wedding on the show on the 6th November 2020, also making Wilder Mullens her step son.

Early in 2021, Nicole realised she was struggling with past events, such as the crash, and losing her daughter Kiri, and decided to seek help from a therapist. Her therapist turned out to be past character Carla Crozier, now going by Carla Summerfield. Carla convinces Nicole to cut her mother out of her life, leading to arguments between the family. She manipulates Nicole into believing things, such as that her best friend Harper is jealous of her relationship with Carla, that Maeve is trying to control her, and that she needed time away from Maeve.

Reception
An episode that saw Nicole refer to Tauranga as not being as gay friendly as Auckland proved highly controversial. Bay of Plenty Tourism general manager, Tim Burgess believed the show was establishing a "negative stereotype," and that the, "only positive thing I can say is they were pronouncing Tauranga and Mauao correctly." In response to the episode he referred to the writing team as "disappointing and lazy." Burgess also requested an apology.

The storyline that saw Nicole marry herself was heavily criticised, and was singled out by script writer Lynette Crawford-Williams as the single biggest regret she had whilst working on the soap for 13 years. Comedian Guy Williams, who despite describing his love for the show, named the plot as, "a bit weird". Melenie Parkes writing for Yahoo! Entertainment labelled the wedding episode as the most "outrageous" aired in 2013. Matthew Denton of the University of Auckland student magazine, Craccum, named Nicole as the shows 6th most annoying character due to the storyline.

References

Shortland Street characters
Fictional bisexual females
Fictional nurses
Television characters introduced in 2009
Fictional LGBT characters in television
Female characters in television